Gil Cates Jr. (born October 4, 1969) is an American producer and director, and former actor. His 2006 documentary film Life After Tomorrow, which he co-produced and directed with Julie Stevens, won awards for both Best Documentary and Best Director at the Phoenix Film Festival and had its premiere on Showtime. He is the executive director of the Geffen Playhouse in Los Angeles.

Director
Born in New York City, he directed the feature film "The Surface", starring Sean Astin and Chris Mulkey, and co-produced the 2013 film Jobs starring Ashton Kutcher and Josh Gad. In addition Cates is the director of the 2001 film The Mesmerist starring Neil Patrick Harris and Jessica Capshaw, the 2002 film A Midsummer Night's Rave, the 2006 documentary film Life After Tomorrow, the 2008 film Deal starring Burt Reynolds, the 2009 gambling documentary "Pass the Sugar", and the 2011 film Lucky starring Colin Hanks, Ari Graynor, and Ann-Margret. Cates made his television directorial debut with was an episode of the NBC comedy Joey starring Emmy winner Matt LeBlanc and is currently directing a documentary short chronicling the journey of one of the first refugee families to flee Ukraine and arrive in the US after the Russian invasion.

Actor
Cates television credits include the 1991 Matlock Season 6 two-part episode The Suspect, the 1992 Major Dad Season 3 episode Three Angry Marines, the 1992 Silk Stalkings Season 1 episode Internal Affair, and the 1993 Doogie Howser, M.D. gay-themed Season 4 episode Spell it M-A-N.

Cates film credits include parts in the 1992 John Landis film Innocent Blood, the 1997 award-nominated film Lovelife, and the 1999 NetForce .

Family
Cates and his wife have two young children and reside in Los Angeles. He is the son of Jane Betty Dubin and television producer and film director Gilbert Cates, and is a cousin to the film actress Phoebe Cates.

Director filmography
 The Surface (2014)
  Lucky (2011)
 Pass the Sugar (2009)
  Deal (2008)
 Life After Tomorrow (2006)
 A Midsummer Night's Rave (2002)
 The Mesmerist (2002)
 $pent (2000)

References

External links

1969 births
Living people
American male film actors
American male television actors
Film directors from New York (state)
Film producers from New York (state)
Male actors from New York City